Daud Shah Saba (born 1964) is a politician in Afghanistan, who is serving as Governor of Herat Province since August 2010 when his predecessor Ahmad Yusuf Nuristani had resigned from the post.

Early years and education
Daud Shah Saba was born in 1964 in Herat, Afghanistan. He belongs to the Popalzai Pashtun tribe. After finishing primary school, he attended the Kabul Polytechnic Institute and obtained a MS in Economic Geology in 1986. He taught in the same institute for six years. In 1996, he travelled to India where he obtained a Ph.D. in Earth Science from the University of Mumbai. He is able speak Dari (Persian), Pashto, English and Hindi.

Later years and careers
In 2000, Saba published a book Gozar Az Tangna, which is about his vision of sociopolitical situation in Afghanistan. He served as the President of Afghan Green Leave Consulting, LLC, which is a Kabul based consulting firm registered with the Afghanistan Investment Support Agency. It was established in 2009 by Daud Saba and Martijn Hekman, an international development expert.

Saba is an Afghan Canadian who has been involved for about 20 years in international development, natural resources and environmental management, with a focus in Afghanistan. He has worked with many international firms and implemented projects in most of the provinces of Afghanistan. Saba has recently served as the Human Development Advisor to the President Hamid Karzai. On 24 August 2010, Saba was appointed by President Karzai as Governor of Herat province after former governor, Muhammad Yousuf Nuristani, began running for in the 2010 parliamentary election.

See also 
List of governors of Herat
Herat Province
Herat

References

External links

Herat City Transitions to ANSF
Twin Suicide Attacks Kill, Injure 37 In Herat

1964 births
Governors of Herat Province
Living people
Afghan physicians
Afghan educators
Pashtun people
People from Herat
Kabul Polytechnic University alumni
University of Mumbai alumni